Qalat-e Nilu (also Romanized as Qalāt-e Nīlū) is a village in Famur Rural District, Jereh and Baladeh District, Kazerun County, Fars Province, Iran. At the 2006 census, its population was 857, in 182 families.

References 

Populated places in Kazerun County